is a Japanese football player.

Career
After a serious injury, he was released by V-Varen Nagasaki in May 2016.

Club statistics
Updated to 23 February 2016.

References

External links

Profile at Football Lab

1992 births
Living people
Fukuoka University alumni
Association football people from Ōita Prefecture
Japanese footballers
J2 League players
V-Varen Nagasaki players
Association football defenders